Hajrudin "Dino" Đurbuzović (born 14 August 1956) is a Bosnian professional football manager and former player.

Playing career
Born in Sarajevo, SFR Yugoslavia, present day Bosnia and Herzegovina on 14 August 1956, Đurbuzović started playing football in his hometown club Željezničar. He was first playing in the youth team, but then signed a professional contract with the club, however he never played a single official game for the first team. 

Đurbuzović was loaned-out to Iskra Bugojno and that proved to be a good decision as he was later transferred to this second division club. He was a talented striker and after several seasons in Iskra, he signed a contract with Čelik Zenica, and would make 18 appearances for the club in the Yugoslav First League.

In 1985, he went to Turkey where he played for Kayserispor, Gençlerbirliği and Ankaragücü. Đurbuzović ended his playing career in 1990 after leaving Ankaragücü.

Managerial career
Đurbuzović continued to play a significant role in Bosnian football as a manager. He firstly worked as the Bosnia and Herzegovina U17 national team head coach from 1995 until 1996. He then worked as the manager of Željezničar, with whom, in his second appointment, won the now disabled Bosnian Supercup in 2000. During 1999, Đurbuzović held the position of the senior Bosnia and Herzegovina national team assistant coach.

He also worked as a manager at Čelik Zenica and Travnik. As an assistant manager, Đurbuzović worked at Gaziantepspor and Denizlispor. He came back to Željezničar and was appointed as assistant manager in June 2009, after which he got promoted to a manager in 2013. He left the post at the end of the 2013–14 season after finishing fourth in the Bosnian Premier League.

During the 2014–15 season, Đurbuzović was the manager of Al-Muharraq in Bahrain. In November 2017, it was announced that he was assuming the position of manager of Olimpik. Đurbuzović parted ways with Olimpik on 2 April 2018.

Honours

Manager
Željezničar 
Bosnian Supercup: 2000

References

External links
BiH Timovi u Yu ligi

1956 births
Living people
Footballers from Sarajevo
Association football midfielders
Bosnia and Herzegovina footballers
Yugoslav footballers
FK Željezničar Sarajevo players
NK Iskra Bugojno players
NK Čelik Zenica players
Kayserispor footballers
Gençlerbirliği S.K. footballers
MKE Ankaragücü footballers
Yugoslav Second League players
Yugoslav First League players
Süper Lig players
TFF First League players
Yugoslav expatriate footballers
Expatriate footballers in Turkey
Yugoslav expatriate sportspeople in Turkey
Bosnia and Herzegovina football managers
FK Željezničar Sarajevo managers
NK Čelik Zenica managers
NK Travnik managers
Al-Muharraq SC managers
FK Olimpik managers
Premier League of Bosnia and Herzegovina managers
Bosnia and Herzegovina expatriate football managers
Expatriate football managers in Bahrain
Bosnia and Herzegovina expatriate sportspeople in Bahrain